The Battle of Slankamen was fought on 19 August 1691, near Slankamen in the Ottoman Sanjak of Syrmia (modern-day Vojvodina, Serbia), between the Ottoman Empire, and Habsburg Austrian forces during the Great Turkish War.

The battle saw a Turkish-Transylvanian force led by Emeric Thököly and Mustafa Köprülü suffer an overwhelming defeat by an Imperial army commanded by Ludwig Wilhelm of Baden. The Grand Vizir Mustafa Köprülü was killed by a stray bullet and the Ottoman army routed, leaving behind the war chest and their artillery. The battle was disastrous for the Turks and costly for the Austrians. The victory stabilized the Hungarian front and secured Hungary, Croatia and Transylvania for the Habsburgs.

Background
The Ottomans suffered a series of defeats against the Archduchy of Austria in the 1680s, most notably at the Battle of Vienna in 1683, Buda in 1686, Belgrade in 1688 and Bosnia in 1689. However, with the beginning of the Nine Years War in the west, the early 1690s were to see an end to Habsburg conquests in the Balkans and a partial Ottoman recovery. Many German troops were withdrawn to fight King Louis' French forces on the Rhine, encouraging the Ottomans, led by the Grand Vizier Köprülü Fazıl Mustafa Pasha, to counterattack.

In April 1690 the death of Michael I Apafi In April 1690 pushed the Sultan to nominate Hungarian Emeric Thököly prince of Transylvania, Thököly at the head of an army quickly occupied much of the principality. When the Imperial army left Belgrade to defeat Thököly in September, Köprülü managed to retake Belgrade and massacre the garrison which the Ottomans had lost in 1688.

In August 1691, Ludwig Wilhelm (Türkenlouis) marched down the Danube to provoke the Ottomans into another major battle, after gathering a new Imperial army of 33,000, including a 10,000 strong Serb militia, under the command of vice-voivoda Jovan Monasterlija.

Battle
The clash between the two forces took place on the west side of the Danube, opposite the outlet of the Tisa. Both armies deployed near Zemun, but the superior Ottoman army did not attack for two days, the Ottomans lacked the vital Tartar component of their army, which was still travelling south. By withdrawing slowly to a fortified position near Slankamen Ludwig Wilhelm tried to provoke the attack. The Ottomans followed and surrounded the Imperial Army. By 19 August, heat, disease and desertion had reduced both armies to 33,000 and 50,000 able men. On that day the Ottoman cavalry finally attacked.

These were unorganized charges, however; although huge, the Ottoman forces were poorly armed and no match for the firepower of Ludwig Wilhelm's German-Austrian infantry and field guns. Additionally, the Ottomans' supply system was incapable of waging a long war on the empty expanses of the Pannonian plain.

Initially, the Ottomans were at an advantage, as they advanced and burned 800 supply wagons of the Imperial Army. Ludwig Wilhelm, in a desperate situation, broke out of his position, besieged by the Ottomans, and turned their flanks with his cavalry, inflicting fearful carnage. After a hard battle, the 33,000-man Imperial Army was victorious over the larger Ottoman force. The death of Grand Vizier Köprülü Fazıl Mustafa Pasha during mid-battle caused the Ottoman morale to drop and the army to disperse and retreat.

Aftermath
The Battle of Slankamen was the last battle in the War that could have brought the war back in Ottomans' favour. The Austrians took Transylvania but were not able to press their advantage as they had gotten involved with France in the war of the Grand Alliance. The Ottoman defeat eventually lead to the treaty of Karlowitz in 1699. For his victories against the Turks Ludwig Wilhelm of Baden earned the nickname  ("Turkish Louis").

Legacy
A  was built in Slankamen to commemorate the victory of the Imperial Army.

Images

Citations

References 
 David Chandler. The Art of Warfare in the Age of Marlborough. Spellmount Limited, (1990). 
 David Chandler. A Guide to the Battlefields of Europe. Wordsworth Editions Ltd, (1998). 
 Derek McKay and H.M. Scott. The Rise of the Great Powers 1648–1815. Longman, (1984). 
 Christian Greiner: Der „Türkenlouis“ – Markgraf Ludwig von Baden-Baden (1655–1707). In: Militärgeschichtliche Beiträge. Bd. 3, 1989, 
 Jason Goodwin; The Ottoman Wars

Battles of the Great Turkish War
Conflicts in 1691
Battle of Slankamen
Battle of Slankamen
Battles involving the Holy Roman Empire
Battles involving the Ottoman Empire
Battles involving Habsburg Croatia
17th-century military history of Croatia
Battles involving Serbia
Battle of Slankamen
Battle of Slankamen
Battle of Slankamen
Battle of Slankamen
Battles involving Serbian Militia